Ait Bouada is a town in north central Algeria.  The town is located in Kabylie, about 130 kilometres east of Algiers.
Ait Bouada is at an elevation of ~500 meters (~1650 ft).

Population
Its inhabitants are predominantly Sunni Muslims and speak Kabyle as their first language.

Geography

History
The town was mentioned by the French as early as 1846  
Following the colonisation of Algeria by the French, a lot of its inhabitants fled the region to Syria.

References 

Kabylie
Towns in Algeria
Populated places in Tizi Ouzou Province